The King of Nepal (traditionally known as the Mahārājdhirāja i.e. Great King of Kings; it can also be translated as "Sovereign Emperor") was Nepal's head of state and monarch from 1768 to 2008. He served as the head of the Nepalese monarchy—Shah Dynasty. The monarchy was abolished on 28 May 2008 by the 1st Constituent Assembly.  The subnational monarchies in Mustang, Bajhang, Salyan, and Jajarkot were abolished in October of the same year.

History

The Kingdom of Nepal was founded on 25 September 1768 by Prithvi Narayan Shah, a Gorkha king who succeeded in unifying the kingdoms of Kathmandu, Patan, and Bhaktapur into a single state under his Shah dynasty. The Kingdom of Nepal was de jure an absolute monarchy for most of its history. However, from 1846 until the 1951 revolution, the country was de facto ruled by the hereditary prime ministers from the Rana dynasty, reducing the role of the Shah monarch to that of a figurehead. In November 1990, after the Jana Andolan movement, a new constitution was adopted and the country became a constitutional monarchy.

Nepalese Civil War
On 13 February 1996, the Nepalese Civil War was launched by the Communist Party of Nepal (Maoist), with the aim of overthrowing the kingdom and establishing a "People's Republic".

Nepalese royal massacre
On 1 June 2001, nine members of the royal family, including King Birendra and Queen Aishwarya, were killed in a mass shooting at the royal residence. Crown Prince Dipendra was implicated in an official investigation. There is a huge controversy concerning this, as there was no practical investigation on that which proves his involvement. Many Nepali people believe that there might be many other people involved in the massacre. Immediately after the massacre, Dipendra was proclaimed king while in a coma, but he died on 4 June 2001, after a three-day reign. His uncle, Prince Gyanendra, was appointed regent for the three days, then ascended the throne himself after Dipendra died.

Post-massacre
On 1 February 2005, as the security situation deteriorated in the civil war, King Gyanendra staged a coup d'état, declared a state of emergency, suspended the constitution and assumed direct control over the country. On 24 April 2006, after the Loktantra Andolan movement, the king agreed to give up absolute power and to reinstate the dissolved House of Representatives. On 21 November 2006, the civil war was ended with the signing of the Comprehensive Peace Accord. On 15 January 2007, the King was suspended from exercising his duties by the newly formed interim legislature. Finally, on 28 May 2008, the kingdom was officially abolished by the 1st Constituent Assembly and Federal Democratic Republic of Nepal was declared. The subnational monarchies in Mustang, Bajhang, Salyan, and Jajarkot were also abolished in October 2008.

Note

Prithvi Narayan Shah was the first ruler of "unified" Nepal. However, prior to 1768, the modern-day Nepal consisted of various small kingdoms, among which Shah Kings continued to rule in a few of them (notably in Gorkha). So the actual history of the Shah dynasty dates much before Prithvi Narayan Shah.

Royal Standard & Royal Crown

See also
 List of heads of state of Nepal, for a comprehensive list of Nepalese heads of state since 1768
 President of Nepal
 Prime Minister of Nepal
 List of prime ministers of Nepal
 Coronation of the Nepalese monarch
 Rastriya Prajatantra Party Nepal
 National Defence Army

References

Nepal, King

Nepali Monarchs
Kingdom of Nepal
2008 disestablishments in Nepal